The Robarts Research Institute is a medical research institute at the University of Western Ontario.  Staff scientists work to investigate a range of diseases including heart disease, stroke, diabetes, Alzheimer's disease, and cancer.

History
The institute was founded in 1986 by neurologist Henry Barnett, known for his discovery of aspirin as a preventive therapy for heart attack and stroke. Mark J. Poznansky became Scientific Director in 1993 and was awarded the Order of Canada in 2005 for his work at Robarts.

External links
Official site

University of Western Ontario
1986 establishments in Ontario
Companies based in London, Ontario